Salvation from Hell (Arabic:  Al Najun Min Al Nar, also translated as Saved from the Inferno) was a militant Islamic organization which operated in Egypt in the 1980s.

During a 1989 trial in Egypt, 26 defendants were charged with forming Salvation from Hell, an illegal paramilitary organization, in addition to other charges. The Egyptian government broke off ties with Iran following allegations that Iran funded the group. Yasser Borhamy was detained for a month in 1987 due to his alleged connection with the assassination attempt against interior minister Hassan Abu Basha. Hussein al-Zawahiri, the brother of Ayman al-Zawahiri and Muhammad al-Zawahiri, was convicted for his alleged role in the assassination attempt.

Sources
Egypt: Islamic Fundamentalist Organisations: The Muslim Brotherhood and the Gama'A Al-Islamiya (The Islamic Group) UNHCR

References

Jihadist groups in Egypt
Defunct organizations designated as terrorist in Africa
1980s in Egypt
Paramilitary organisations based in Egypt